Animosity may refer to:

Animosity (comic), an American comic book series published by AfterShock Comics
Animosity (band), an American death metal band formed in 2000
Animosity (Corrosion of Conformity album), 1985
Animosity (Sevendust album), 2001
Animosity (The Berzerker album), 2007
Animosity (film), a 2013 horror film

See also
Animositisomina, a 2003 album by Ministry